Ren-ai District (alternately Ren'ai) is a district of the city of Keelung, Taiwan. It is the smallest district of Keelung City.

Administrative divisions
The district administers 29 urban villages:
 Linquan/Lincyuan, Huagang, Hongqiao/Hongciao, Shuijin/Shueijin, Zhiren/Jhihren, Heming, Zhongyong/Jhongyong, Yutian, Rende, Boai/Bo-ai/Bo'ai, Furen, Chengren , Jiren, Yuren, Yingren, Longmen, Dehou, Qushui/Cyushuei, Chongwen/Chongwun, Wenan/Wen'an/Wun-an, Zhaolian/Jhaolian, Shiqiu/Shihciou, Shuyuan , Zhaodong/Jhaodong, Mingde, Tongfeng/Tongfong, Wenchang/Wunchang, Xindian/Sindian  and Guanghua  Village.

Tourist attractions
 Chingan Temple
 Miaokou Night Market
 Mount Hungtan
 Peace Square
 Shihchiuling Battery
 Tienchi Temple
 YM Oceanic Culture and Art Museum

Transportation
The district is accessible from Keelung Station and Sankeng Station of the Taiwan Railways.

Notable natives
 Lin Yu-chang, Mayor of Keelung City

See also

 Keelung City Government

References

Districts of Keelung